This is a list of areas, tourist attractions and other places of interest in the English town of Swindon.

Areas
 Abbey Meads
 Bridgemead
 Broome Manor
Home to the Broome Manor Golf Course and various businesses including the world headquarters of Burmah Castrol as well as the UK headquarters of the Nationwide Building Society and Intel.
 Cheney Manor
Built around 1952.
 Churchward
 Coleview
 Covingham
Home to 3,781 residents (2001 census). Covingham Park estate was built in 1964.
 Croft
 Dorcan
Taking its name from the nearby Dorkerne (now Dorcan) brook, Dorcan lies between Eldene, Liden, Covingham and the A419 bypass. Parts of these surrounding areas are also sometimes referred to as being in Dorcan (such as Eldene Shopping Centre which uses Dorcan in its address). It is the site of the Dorcan Industrial Estate which includes the UK Headquarters of Tyco Electronics and RWE npower.
The Dorcan Academy (formerly Dorcan Comprehensive School) is also in this area, providing the locality with sports facilities. Notable as the school attended by Melinda Messenger, and actor Mark Lawrence (from the series Band of Brothers).
 Eastleaze
 Eastmead
 East Wichel – part of the Wichelstowe development
 Eldene
Built in the 1970s on the site of Snodshill Farm, the site of Texaco offices 
 Even Swindon – now more commonly known as Rodbourne
 Ferndale
 Freshbrook
Part of West Swindon, the estate was built during the period 1980-84.
Including offices of RWE and Cable & Wireless at Windmill Hill.
 Gorse Hill
 Grange Park
 Greenbridge
Mainly large areas of business, including the world headquarters of WH Smith and the former site of the EMI UK CD pressing plant
 Greenmeadow
 Hawksworth
 Haydon Wick
 Kembrey Park
 Kingsdown
 Lawn
 Liden
Includes three large tower blocks
 Marshgate
 Moredon
 Middleleaze
 New Town (a.k.a. Swindon Town Centre)
 Nine Elms
 North Star
Including the Oasis leisure centre and Swindon College

 Nythe
 Oakley Park
 Okus
 Old Town
 Park North
Estate built during the period 1957-65
Also includes three 10-storey tower blocks
 Park South
Estate built during the period 1957-65
Including Cavendish Square, a shopping area which has now been rebuilt into a smaller shopping area with the removal of the residential flats above the shops, except George Hall Court.  Nearby St. Clements Court has also been demolished and new homes built.
 Peatmoor
 Pembroke Park
 Penhill
Built during the period 1951-55
Includes three 10-storey tower blocks
 Pinehurst
Built during the period 1910-20 as Swindon's first council housing estate.
 Railway Village
Built during the period 1840-45 by the Great Western Railway to house employees.
 Ramleaze
 Raybrook Park
 Rodbourne
 Rodbourne Cheney
 Rushey Platt
 Shaw
 South Leaze
 Sparcells
 South Marston
Including the UK Headquarters of Zimmer and the large Honda car plant.
 Stratton St Margaret
 Upper Stratton
 Lower Stratton
 St Andrew's Ridge
 Taw Hill
 The Prinnels
 Toothill
Part of West Swindon, council estate built during the period 1980-84
 Walcot East
Built from 1956
Formerly included the University of Bath Oakfield campus, which has since been demolished. This was situated very near Park North.
 Walcot West (Old Walcot)
Built from the mid-1930s
 Westmead
 Westlea
The West Swindon shopping centre, the first out of town, had a supermarket and other small shops; later the Link Centre, a leisure centre with an ice rink and swimming pool, was added.
 West Leaze
 Windmill Hill

Areas Under Construction
 Priory Vale or North Swindon Development –  – includes Redhouse, Oakhurst and Haydon End
 Wichelstowe or Southern Development Area –

Places of interest

 Coate Water 
 County Ground - Swindon Town F.C.'s stadium.
Lawns Park 
 Lydiard Park 
 Lydiard House 
 The Magic Roundabout - a large roundabout containing 5 mini-roundabouts
Museum of Computing 
 Queens Park
Richard Jefferies Museum 
 Steam Railway Museum 
Swindon Museum and Art Gallery 
Town Gardens

See also
 Honda of the UK Manufacturing
 RWE npower
 Nationwide Building Society
 Intel
 Motorola

References

Places in Swindon